Anthidium rodecki is a species of bee in the family Megachilidae, the leaf-cutter, carder, or mason bees.

Distribution
Southwestern United States.

References

rodecki
Insects described in 1934